Pseudepimolis ridenda is a moth of the family Erebidae first described by Paul Dognin in 1911. It is found in French Guiana and Brazil.

References

Phaegopterina
Moths described in 1911